Digelu (also known as Kidame Digelu) is a town in central Ethiopia. It is one of three settlements in Digeluna Tijo woreda.

A survey of Digelu made in 1970  portrayed the town sitting in a forested area where tree felling had just started. Inhabitants were about three times as many Shewa Oromo as Arsi Oromo.

Based on figures from the Central Statistical Agency of Ethiopia published in 2005, Digelu has an estimated total population of 1,623 consisting of 738 men and 885 women. The 1994 census reported this town had a total population of 910 of whom 400 were males and 510 females.

Notes 

Populated places in the Oromia Region